The Central Park mandarin duck, also known as Mandarin Patinkin or the Hot Duck, is a male mandarin duck seen at the Pond in New York City's Central Park starting in late 2018. Its colorful appearance, which contrasted with native waterfowl, combined with its presence far outside of the species' native range of East Asia, led to media attention from late 2018 through 2019. Though it has a band around its leg, its origin is undetermined. Its last sighting was in March 2019. In 2021, entertainer Bette Midler published a children's book about it.

Sighting and public attention
The mandarin duck was first spotted at Central Park's Pond by birder Gus Keri in early October 2018. Its appearance was disseminated by another birder, David Barrett, who operates the Twitter account Manhattan Bird Alert and was described as the duck's "kingmaker" and "de-facto PR spokesman". It quickly became a local celebrity, with the duck and the public's enthusiasm for it receiving national and international coverage, covered by the BBC, The New York Times, The Guardian, CNN, the People's Daily in China, and making front-page news as far away as the Los Angeles Times. Several vendors began producing and selling merchandise referencing or depicting the duck, turning it into a tourist attraction. The New York Times noted that it "[had] become an international celebrity. A living, breathing, quacking meme." The Associated Press dubbed the crowd following the duck "the quackarazzi". It has also been credited with sparking broader interest in birding in New York.

New York Magazine The Cut initially covered it as "New York's Most Eligible Bachelor" in its Dating section and subsequently called it "Hot Duck", while the website Gothamist named it Mandarin Patinkin, after Broadway actor Mandy Patinkin.

Not long after its initial sighting, it disappeared for almost two weeks before returning to the Pond. Whenever the duck was not seen for a period of days or when it was seen somewhere other than Central Park, it received media coverage, such as when it showed up in Brooklyn or Edgewater, New Jersey. Multiple accounts describe "panic" among birdwatchers during these times. The website Quartz set up a website dedicated to tracking whether or not it had been spotted in Central Park that day.

Paul Sweet, Collection Manager in the Department of Ornithology at the American Museum of Natural History, criticized the enthusiasm for the duck. Though he credited the phenomenon with raising interest in birding, he pointed out the dangers that exotic species pose to native species in general and compared the experience of seeing an escaped duck in Central Park to seeing a bird in a zoo: "In British birder parlance, this is a 'plastic' duck, an escaped pet, one that can be bought online. It is not a rare bird or a first record or anything of that nature, so to me, of zero ornithological interest." Even within city limits, there are several other mandarin ducks at zoos, according to AMNY. Both Sweet and WNYC News urged redirecting public interest to the many attractive native species found in New York, like the wood ducks which also frequent Central Park. Audubon editor Andrew Del-Colle echoed similar sentiments in an "open letter" to the duck, telling it that it was not " special". Others criticized the behavior of people watching the bird for violating birding ethics by feeding it bread or trying to get it to move to where it could be seen more easily.

Gothamist Jen Carlson likened its public attention to a cult, with its crowd of onlookers by the Central Park Pond "[taking] on an apocalyptic circus vibe on weekends. Part Audubon field trip, part Burning Man." In other articles, she wrote about some of the reasons it may have become so popular, making a comparison to the role of ducks in The Catcher in the Rye, symbolizing "all we have that is good anymore."

Origin

There are small populations of mandarin ducks in the United States formed by escaped or released domestic ducks, but none near New York. Its native range is East Asia.

The Central Park duck's origin is unknown, but New York is too far from its natural territories for it to have simply gotten lost during migration, which accounts for some other rare sightings. Observers quickly noted a band around its leg suggesting it had been captive. Zoos denied ownership, and the type of band used indicated a private owner from whom it had likely escaped. Nobody stepped forward to claim ownership, perhaps because ducks are illegal to have as pets in the city. Tom Moorman of Ducks Unlimited told the L.A. Times that it likely settled in Central Park because it was already a hotspot for other ducks. The New York City Parks Department announced that it would monitor the duck through the 2018–19 winter, and would not try to capture it unless it needed help.

Disappearance 
The duck was last seen in Central Park in March 2019, leaving before the species' mating season. Despite false positive sightings and speculation that it would likely return in September, after molting season, it has not been seen . According to Barrett, "Before, even when he ventured to the rivers, our spies found him and posted footage. My best guess was that he flew far enough north to a small pond remote from people."

Children's book 
In 2018, entertainer Bette Midler and literary critic Michiko Kakutani discussed the duck at a party, when Kakutani shared pictures she had taken of it. Midler was inspired to write a story about the effect the duck was having on people, causing them to look up from their cell phone screens to look at natural beauty. The book was published as The Tale of the Mandarin Duck in 2021, written by Midler, with photographs by Kakutani and illustrations by Joana Avillez.

See also
 List of individual birds

References

External links
 

2018 in New York City
2019 in New York City
Birds in popular culture
Central Park
Individual waterfowl